Sara Eskander Poulsen (born January 2, 1984) is a Danish actress. She has provided voices for a number of Danish-language versions of foreign television series and films. She is best known for voicing Candace Flynn in Phineas and Ferb and for dubbing Brenda Song's character London Tipton in The Suite Life of Zack & Cody and The Suite Life on Deck.

Early life
Poulsen was born in Copenhagen, Denmark. In 2007, she graduated from Performing Arts School.

Dubbing roles

Animated Series
 Mandy in Totally Spies!
 Mandy in The Grim Adventures of Billy & Mandy 
 Candace Flynn in Phineas and Ferb  
 Vicky in The Fairly OddParents 
 Layla in Winx Club
Stella in World of Winx

Animated films
 EVE in WALL-E
 Bratz: Desert Jewelz
 Bratz Kidz: Sleep-Over Adventure 
 Bratz Kidz: Fairy Tales 
 Bratz: Fashion Pixiez  
 Pokémon: The Movie 2000

Live action
 London Tipton (Brenda Song) in The Suite Life of Zack & Cody 
 London Tipton (Brenda Song) in The Suite Life on Deck
 Jade LaFontaine (Florencia Benítez) in Violetta

See also
 SDI Media Denmark

References

External links
 
 
 Sara Poulsen at DFI

Danish voice actresses
1984 births
Living people
Actresses from Copenhagen